Golden Lion (also sometimes Red Lion) was a ship of the English Tudor navy, launched in 1557. She was rebuilt for the first time in 1582.

By the time of her second rebuild, in 1609, she was known as Lion. She was rebuilt at Deptford as a Great ship of 38 guns.

In 1613 The Lion was appointed to escort Princess Elizabeth, daughter of James VI and I, and Frederick V of the Palatinate sailing in The Prince Royal from Margate to Ostend.

In 1640 she was rebuilt again, this time at Woolwich. She was rebuilt for a final time at Chatham in 1658, as a 48-gun third rate ship of the line. By 1677 Lion was mounting 60 guns.

She was sold out of the navy in 1698.

Notes

References
Citations

Bibliography

Lavery, Brian (2003) The Ship of the Line - Volume 1: The development of the battlefleet 1650-1850. Conway Maritime Press. .

Ships of the line of the Royal Navy
Ships of the English navy
16th-century ships